Nankhatai (Hindustani: नानख़टाई (Devanagari) /  (Urdu)) are shortbread biscuits originating from the larger Bengal region of the Indian subcontinent, popular in Northern India, Pakistan, Bangladesh, and Myanmar (formerly Burma).

Etymology 
Nankhatai has been borrowed into the Burmese language as nankahtaing (နံကထိုင်). It is called by "NaanaHatha" (நானஹத்தா) in Tamil language in East Tamil Nadu & "Gnanakathaa" ( ඤාණකතා) in The Sinhala Language in Sri Lanka. In Afghanistan and Northeast Iran, these biscuits are called kulcha-e-khataye. Kulcha is a type of Afghan, Iranian and Indian bread similar to naan.

History
Nankhatai is believed to have originated in Surat in the 16th century, when Dutch and Indians were the important spice traders. A Dutch couple set up a bakery in Surat to meet the needs of local Dutch residents. When the Dutch left India, they handed over the bakery to an Iranian. The bakery biscuits were disliked by the locals. To save his business he started selling dried bread at low prices. It became so popular that he started drying the bread before selling it. With time, his experimentation with bread inspired him to ultimately invent nankhatai. The main ingredients in nankhatai are refined flour, chickpea flour and semolina.

See also
 List of shortbread biscuits and cookies
Qurabiya

References

Burmese cuisine
Indian cuisine
Bengali cuisine
Pakistani cuisine
Biscuits
Shortbread
Burmese desserts and snacks
Bangladeshi cuisine